Aniar (meaning "From the west") is a restaurant in Galway, Ireland. It is a fine dining restaurant that is awarded one Michelin star in 2013 and retained that rating until present.

The head chef to win the Michelin star was Enda McEvoy. He left in 2013 and Ultan Cooke took over. He retained the star for 2014. The owner Jp McMahon took over the kitchen upon Cooke's departure in June 2015. He retained the star that year.

Awards
 Michelin star: since 2013
 Best Restaurant in Connaught: 2012, 2015, 2016
 Best Restaurant in Galway: 2013

See also
List of Michelin starred restaurants in Ireland

References

Michelin Guide starred restaurants in Ireland